Atlantic Avenue is a major thoroughfare in the New York City boroughs of Brooklyn and Queens. It stretches from the Brooklyn waterfront on the East River all the way to Jamaica, Queens. Atlantic Avenue runs parallel to Fulton Street for much of its course through Brooklyn, where it serves as a border between the neighborhoods of Prospect Heights and Fort Greene and between Bedford-Stuyvesant and Crown Heights.

Atlantic Avenue is the sole east–west through truck route across Brooklyn, mostly serving the purpose of the canceled Bushwick Expressway (Interstate 78) and the Brooklyn portion of the Cross Brooklyn Expressway (New York State Route 878, internally known as Interstate 878). The street connects to the existing segment of NY 878 via Conduit Boulevard, which splits from Atlantic Avenue in Brooklyn and connects to NY 878 in Queens.

Route description
 
In Brooklyn, the area of Atlantic nearest the South Ferry waterfront has long been known for its antique shops and its notable Arab community, including mosques, specialty shops and restaurants specializing in Middle Eastern cuisine. As it stretches east toward Flatbush Avenue, Atlantic separates the neighborhoods of Brooklyn Heights and Cobble Hill and passes through Boerum Hill near Downtown Brooklyn. This section of Atlantic Avenue is the site of the Atlantic Antic, an annual street fair involving local and visiting merchants and artists, held in early October.

At Flatbush Avenue and Fourth Avenue the crossing of the three major thoroughfares form a triangular intersection historically known as Times Plaza. Here the smaller shops, restaurants, churches and boutiques give way to the Atlantic Terminal, where nine subway services at Atlantic Avenue – Barclays Center converge with the Long Island Rail Road (LIRR). The area is dominated by massive buildings, formerly factories, now used by storage companies, and by the Atlantic Center Mall (opened in 1996, with tenants including P.C. Richard & Son and Modell's), Atlantic Terminal Mall (opened in 2004, with tenants including Target) and Barclays Center. All three are products of developer Forest City Ratner.

The face of Atlantic Avenue east of Flatbush Avenue, the site designated for the Brooklyn Atlantic Yards, is defined by the LIRR tracks that run beneath (from Flatbush Avenue to Bedford Avenue), above (from Bedford Avenue to Dewey Place), and beneath again in East New York until Lefferts Boulevard in Queens.

The Atlantic Avenue Railroad (now LIRR) originally ran along Atlantic Avenue as streetcars pulled by horses. With electrification, other traffic was eliminated from the roadway and Atlantic Avenue became discontinuous. When railway sections west of Jamaica station were put underground in the early 1940s, that portion of Atlantic Avenue became continuous again. East of Jamaica, the railway is still at (or above) ground level.

Just east of the Van Wyck Expressway, the roadway narrows to two lanes and becomes 94th Avenue, after which the roadway soon diverges into side streets, ending as 157th Street at Liberty Avenue. In July 2020, the eastern end of Atlantic Avenue reopened with a block-long extension that funnels eastbound traffic onto 95th Avenue, with newly built Gateway Park at this traffic split. Atlantic Avenue from the Brooklyn Docks to Gateway Park at Van Wyck Expressway is 10.3 miles long, with 7.4 miles in Brooklyn, making it one of Brooklyn's longest streets.

Pre-electrification maps from 1909 and 1910 show Atlantic Avenue, at that time, continued to the city line.

Other iterations of this road
Short roadways still named Atlantic Avenue exist further east adjacent to the LIRR Main Line within Nassau County.
A stretch of road still named Atlantic Avenue, just under one mile long, runs just south of the Main Line from the Bellerose station to the Floral Park station.

Just north of the Merillon Avenue train station in Garden City is another short roadway called Atlantic Avenue. Other short segments of roadway  called Atlantic Avenue exist adjacent to the Main Line at Carle Place in Nassau County, and even as far east as the approach to the Nassau-Suffolk County line, just beyond the Farmingdale LIRR station.

Other roads with the same name
A four-block-long Atlantic Avenue exists in Sea Gate, Brooklyn.

Transportation

The  New York City Bus route runs on Atlantic Avenue from Broadway Junction to Jamaica Center–Parsons/Archer. The  runs on it between its western end and Fourth Avenue. The  buses run on this street for short sections. The New York City Subway's BMT Canarsie Line has a station on this street at East New York Avenue, with another entrance at Van Sinderen Avenue; the Atlantic Avenue–Barclays Center station is also located at 4th and Flatbush Avenues. Long Island Rail Road stations on the Atlantic Branch are located at Flatbush Avenue, Nostrand Avenue, and Van Sinderen Avenue.

See also 
Atlantic Avenue Tunnel
Atlantic Branch of the Long Island Rail Road
Atlantic Terminal LIRR station
Atlantic Avenue–Barclays Center station
Atlantic Terminal Mall

References 

Streets in Brooklyn
Streets in Queens, New York